The Adventure of Archaeology is a 1985 book written by Dr. Brian M. Fagan, published by the National Geographic press publishing company. The book tells about the development of the history of archeology. It contains stories of treasure hunters and tourists and the development of archeology to a scientific field.

References
 

1985 non-fiction books
National Geographic Society books
Archaeology books